The Dolphin Flag of Anguilla was adopted on September 29, 1967, after the colony (then part of Saint Christopher-Nevis-Anguilla) unilaterally declared independence from the United Kingdom as the Republic of Anguilla. It depicted three orange dolphins in a circle on a white background with a turquoise stripe at the bottom. It was used until March 19, 1969, when British rule was restored.

The white background on the flag represents peace. The turquoise stripe represents the Caribbean Sea. The three dolphins represent endurance, unity, and strength, and their circular arrangement represents community.

The flag was designed by Marvin Oberman and Lydia Gumbs. It replaced the earlier "Mermaid Flag" of Anguilla, designed by Scott Newhall, which had been in use since July 23, 1967.

Although no longer official, the Dolphin Flag is still flown today.

See also 
Flag of Anguilla – the current territorial flag of Anguilla

References 

National symbols of Anguilla
Flags introduced in 1967
Unofficial flags
Flags displaying animals